There was no Mister Philippines 2007 male pageant in the Philippines held. Supposedly, the winner of Mister Philippines 2007, represents the Philippines in the 2nd edition of the Mister International male pageant, held at Kuching, Malaysia on 	December 31, 2007. 17 contestants competed for the title.

See also
 Manhunt International
 Mister World

External links
 Mister Philippines website

Mister International